The Southern Counties East Football League is an English football league established in 1966, which has teams based in Kent and Southeast London. Until 2013, it was known as the Kent League. There was a previous Kent League, that existed from 1894 to 1959.

History
The first Kent League was formed in 1894 and folded in 1959. Despite many of the same clubs having spells in membership, there is no direct connection between the two competitions.

The current incarnation of the league was formed in 1966 as the Kent Premier League (changing to Kent Football League in 1968), and in its early years many of its members were reserve sides of Southern League teams.  Gradually, the reserve sides were all shifted down into the lower divisions.

In 2013 the league changed its name to the Southern Counties East League, to reflect the fact that many of its member clubs no longer played within the county of Kent.

At the end of the 2015–16 season, the league merged with the Kent Invicta League and the latter became the lower division of the merged league.

Sponsorship

For the 2012–13 season, the league was sponsored by Hürlimann Sternbräu lager, brewed by Kentish brewers, Shepherd Neame and was therefore billed as the Kent Hurlimann Football League.

Current structure
The league had only one division until the 2015–16 season. In the past it included additional divisions for reserve teams. The league is now at Steps 5–6 of the National League System (which equates to Levels 9–10 of the overall English football league system) since the 2016–17 season, with clubs able to move upwards to the Step 4 divisions of the Isthmian League. Prior to the 2011–12 season, clubs could be relegated to the Kent County League, although in practice this rarely happened. The formation of the new Kent Invicta Football League for the 2011–12 season meant there was a Step 6 league allowing for more frequent promotion/relegation between the Southern Counties East League and the Kent Invicta League. After the merger with the latter league, the Southern Counties East League now has two divisions and is fed by the Kent County League.

List of champions

References

External links
 

 
1
1966 establishments in England
9
Sports leagues established in 1966